Harry Britton Little was an American architect during the early twentieth century.  In 1921, Little formed a partnership with E. Donald Robb and Philip H. Frohman.  Together they gained national recognition as architects for the National Cathedral in Washington D.C.   They also worked on other major works such as the Episcopal Cathedral in Baltimore and the chapel of Trinity College, Hartford.

Little resided in Concord, Massachusetts from 1915 till his death in 1944.  In Concord he designed countless private homes, as well as the Concord Museum, Trinitarian Congregational Church, Fowler Library, and remodeling of the Concord Free Public Library.

References

People from Concord, Massachusetts
American ecclesiastical architects
Architects from Massachusetts
Architects from Boston
Colonial Revival Movement
Gothic Revival architects
Architects of cathedrals
1944 deaths
Year of birth missing